The Littlest Rebel is a 1935 American musical drama film directed by David Butler. The screenplay by Edwin J. Burke was adapted from a play of the same name by Edward Peple.

Cast 
 Shirley Temple as Virgie Cary
 John Boles as Herbert Cary
 Jack Holt as Colonel Morrison
 Karen Morley as Mrs. Cary
 Guinn Williams as Sergeant Dudley
 Frank McGlynn Sr. as President Abraham Lincoln
 Bill Robinson as Uncle Billy  
 Willie Best as James Henry
Bessie Lyle as Mammy Rosabelle
 Hannah Washington as Sally Ann
 Karl Hackett as John Hay (uncredited)
 Jack Mower as Yankee Lt. Hart (uncredited)

Production

The slingshot scene was written into the movie by screenwriter Edwin Burke after he learned of Temple's natural ability to use the slingshot. She was perfectly on target and needed only one take for the scene. Temple made international headlines when in the context of trying to keep noisy doves on the prison set (which the director explained did not belong in war) she asked "Why doesn't someone make Mussolini stop?" Someone overheard her comment and it made it into the newspapers, angering Mussolini.

Critical reception

Upon release
Writing for The Spectator in 1936, Graham Greene gave the film a mildly poor review, explaining that he had "expected there [would be] the usual sentimental exploitation of childhood", but that he "had not expected [Temple's] tremendous energy" which he criticized as "a little too enervating".

Modern criticism
Bill Gibron, of the Online Film Critics Society, wrote: "The racism present in The Littlest Rebel, The Little Colonel and Dimples is enough to warrant a clear critical caveat." However, Gibron, echoing most film critics who continue to see value in Temple's work despite the racism that is present in some of it, also wrote: "Thankfully, the talent at the center of these troubling takes is still worthwhile for some, anyway."

Adaptations
The Littlest Rebel was dramatized as an hour-long radio play on the October 14, 1940 broadcast of Lux Radio Theatre, with Shirley Temple and Claude Rains.

See also
 Shirley Temple filmography
 List of films featuring slavery

References
Footnotes

Works cited
 
 

Bibliography
   The author expounds upon father figures in Temple films.
  In the essay, "Cuteness and Commodity Aesthetics: Tom Thumb and Shirley Temple", author Lori Merish examines the cult of cuteness in America.

External links

 
 
 
 

1935 films
1930s historical films
American Civil War films
American historical films
American black-and-white films
Films directed by David Butler
Films scored by Cyril J. Mockridge
Films set in Virginia
20th Century Fox films
American films based on plays
1930s English-language films
1930s American films